The 1950 Princeton Tigers football team represented Princeton University in National Collegiate Athletic Association (NCAA) intercollegiate competition during the 1950 season. The Tigers were led by sixth-year head coach Charlie Caldwell, a future College Football Hall of Fame inductee, who utilized an "unbalanced" version of the single-wing formation. The Princeton offense, which made use of the buck-lateral series, was one of the last successful employers of the single-wing formation, which had been made obsolete by the modernized T formation.

Princeton finished with a perfect undefeated record of 9–0, and the Tigers outscored their opponents 349–94. Against other future Ivy League teams, Princeton compiled a 5–0 record.

Some selectors named Princeton the national champions, most notably the NCAA-recognized Poling System and Boand System. Princeton was ranked sixth in the Associated Press and eighth in the United Press final polls. After the season, Tigers halfback Dick Kazmaier, tackle Holland Donan, and center Redmond Finney received first-team All-America honors. Kazmaier and Donan were eventually inducted into the College Football Hall of Fame.

Schedule

References

Princeton
Princeton Tigers football seasons
College football national champions
Lambert-Meadowlands Trophy seasons
College football undefeated seasons
Princeton Tigers football